103 Mile Lake is a small lake located near the town of 100 Mile House, in the Cariboo District, in British Columbia, Canada.

Name
Like the town, the lake is named for its distance from Lillooet along the Old Cariboo Road.

References

Lakes of the Cariboo
Lillooet Land District